2002 World Championships may refer to:

 Aquatics: 2002 FINA Short Course World Championships
 Athletics:
Cross-country running: 2002 IAAF World Cross Country Championships
Road running: 2002 IAAF World Half Marathon Championships
Paralympics: 2002 IPC Athletics World Championships
 Badminton: 2002 IBF World Championships
 Basketball:
 2002 FIBA World Championship
 2002 FIBA World Championship for Women
 Chess: FIDE World Chess Championship 2002
 Curling:
 2002 World Men's Curling Championship
 2002 World Women's Curling Championship
 Darts: 2002 BDO World Darts Championship
 Darts: 2002 PDC World Darts Championship
 Figure skating: 2002 World Figure Skating Championships
 Ice hockey: 2002 Men's World Ice Hockey Championships
 Ice hockey: 2002 Women's World Ice Hockey Championships
 Ringette: 2002 World Ringette Championships
 Softball: 2002 World Softball Championships
 Speed skating:
Allround: 2002 World Allround Speed Skating Championships
Sprint: 2002 World Sprint Speed Skating Championships
Single distances: 2002 World Single Distance Speed Skating Championships

See also
 2002 World Cup
 2002 Continental Championships (disambiguation)
 2002 World Junior Championships (disambiguation)